In the petroleum industry, shutting-in is the implementation of a production cap set lower than the available output of a specific site. This may be part of an attempt to constrict the oil supply or a necessary precaution when crews are evacuated ahead of a natural disaster.

In April 2020, as a result of oil futures trading negative, Oklahoma and New Mexico voted to allow wells to shut-in in order to reduce production to combat oversupply.

References

Petroleum production